The Authority for Regulation of Water and Energy Sectors  is an independent regulatory authority of Burundi mandated to provide for technical and economic regulation of electricity and water utilities.

History 

The government of Burundi, through the presidential decree number 100/320 of 2011, established national energy regulator  called the Agency for controlling and Regulating portable water and electricity sector in the Republic of Burundi() on 22nd November 2011. ACR was later renamed the Regulatory Agency for the Drinking Water, Electricity and Mining Sectors  on 11 December 2015 with an expanded mandate of regulating the mining sectors. Later, the government of Burundi adopted the Authority for Regulation of Water and Energy Sectors  through a Presidencial Decree No. 100/159 of 2018 with a narrowed mandate to regulate water and energy sectors.

Location
The offices of the Authority for Regulation of Water and Energy Sectors are located at the ,Commune Mukaza, Zone Rohero, Ave. de la JRR House 17, Immeuble le savonnier, Rez-de-chaussee, Bujumbura city.

Authority
AREEN regulates portable water, energy, basic sanitation, petroleum and petroleum subsectors. The agency is responsible for issuance of  electricity generation licenses, approval of water and electricity tariffs and other permits.  It also undertakes displinary measures against entities that violate the terms and conditions of the permits issued. It is also a full member of the Energy Regulators Association of East Africa.

Electric utilities
AREEN regulates the following utilities;(mini-grid operators and Independent Power Producers.

Governance

The agency is  supervised by a board of directors, chaired by eng. Gaëthan Nicayenzi. The director general of the authority is Balthazar Nganikiye.

References

External Link 
REGIDESO
Burundaise de l'Eléctrification Rurale
Burundais des Mines et Carrières
de l'Hydraulique, de l'Energie et des Mines

Government of Burundi
Water in Burundi